This was the first edition of the tournament.

Illya Marchenko and Denys Molchanov won the title, defeating Roman Jebavý and Błażej Koniusz in the final, 7–6(7–4), 6–3.

Seeds

Draw

Draw

References
 Main Draw

Trofeo Citta di Brescia - Doubles
Trofeo Città di Brescia